Capparis cynophallophora, commonly known as the Jamaican caper, is small tree in the caper family, Capparaceae, that is native to the Neotropical realm.

Description
The brand new leaves at the apical tips of twigs are folded in half showing only the whitish, hairy abaxial (lower or ventral) side of the leaf. The adexical (upper or dorsal) side of the leaf is glossy and darker. Fruits are long and split to release several large, brown seeds.

Habitat and range
The native range of C. cyanophallophora includes Florida in the United States, Mexico, the Caribbean, Central America, and South America as far south as northern Argentina. It inhabits mangrove forests, hammocks and shellmounds in coastal Florida and is extremely drought resistant

References

External links

cynophallophora
Plants described in 1753
Taxa named by Carl Linnaeus
Trees of the Caribbean
Trees of Central America
Trees of the Southeastern United States
Trees of Mexico
Trees of South America
Trees of Cuba
Flora without expected TNC conservation status